A Happy Day of Jinsa Maeng is a 1962 South Korean comedy film directed by Lee Yong-min.

Synopsis
When a rumour spreads that his future son-in-law is crippled, he resorts to tricks to marry off his maid Ip-bun (Choi Eun-hee) instead.

Cast
 Kim Seung-ho as Maeng Jin-sa
 Choi Eun-hee as Ip-bun
 Kim Jin-kyu as Mi-eon
 Kim Hee-kap
 Lee Bin-hwa as Gap-bun

References

External links 
 
 

1962 films
1960s Korean-language films
South Korean comedy films